Dorin may refer to:

 Romanian masculine given name
Dorin Chirtoacă
Dorin Dănilă
Dorin Drăguțanu
Dorin Goian
Dorin Recean
Dorin Rotariu
Dorin Tudoran
 Surname
Françoise Dorin (1928–2018), French actor, comedian, novelist, playwright and songwriter; daughter of René
René Dorin (1891-1969), French chansonnier, screenwriter and playwright

Romanian masculine given names